The 1954 Kentucky Wildcats football team represented the University of Kentucky in the 1954 college football season. The team scored 151 points while allowing 125 points. This was Blanton Collier's first season as Kentucky's head coach.

Schedule

1955 NFL Draft

References

Kentucky
Kentucky Wildcats football seasons
Kentucky Wildcats football